This is a list of notable Haitian people. It includes people who were born in Haiti or possess Haitian citizenship, who are notable in Haiti and abroad. Due to Haitian nationality laws, dual citizenship is now permitted by the Constitution of Haiti, therefore people of Haitian ancestry born outside of the country are not included in this list, unless they have renounced their foreign citizenship or have resided extensively in Haiti and made significant contributions to Haitian government or society. The list includes both native-born and naturalized Haitians, as well as permanent foreign residents who have been recognized internationally for artistic, cultural, economic, historical, criminal, or political reasons, among others. If not indicated here, their birth in Haiti and notability are mentioned in their main article. This list does not include fictional characters or Haitian associations and organizations.

==Academics==
 Peggy Brunache – archaeologist and food historian
 Leslie Desmangles – anthropologist, author, and U.S. college professor
 Anténor Firmin – anthropologist and politician
 Jean Price-Mars – anthropologist and writer
 Jean Lud Cadet – psychiatrist at the National Institute on Drug Abuse
 Michel-Rolph Trouillot – anthropologist and academic

Artists

Business
 Charles Henri Baker – industrialist and 2006 and 2010 presidential candidate
 Gilbert Bigio – billionaire and retired businessman. He is the wealthiest person in Haiti
 Reginald Boulos – entrepreneur
 Jean-Claude Brizard – former CEO of Chicago Public Schools
 Bernard Fils-Aimé – former CEO of Comcel Haiti
 Antoine Izméry – businessman
 Viter Juste – businessman, community leader and activist who coined the name "Little Haiti" for the neighborhood in Miami, Florida in the United States
 Julio Larosiliere – businessman
 Elisabeth Delatour Préval – businesswoman, presidential economic advisor and economist. She was the First Lady of Haiti when she married President René Préval
 Daniel Rouzier – tycoon; appointed as Honorary Consul to Jamaica in 2010
 Mona Scott – CEO of Monami Entertainment in the United States
 Dumarsais Simeus – business executive
 Jerry Tardieu – founder and CEO of Royal Oasis
 Fincy Pierre – founder Balistrad
 Phanord Cabé – Entrepreneur

Organized crime and piracy
 Henri Caesar – allegedly a 19th-century Haitian revolutionary and pirate nicknamed black Caesar
 Jimmy "Babekyou" Chérizier – gang leader and head of the Revolutionary Forces of the G9 Family and Allies
 Emmanuel Constant – founder of FRAPH, a Haitian death squad that terrorised supporters of exiled president Jean-Bertrand Aristide
 Jacquotte Delahaye – one of the few known female pirates (or buccaneers)
 Jean Lafitte – pirate (born in France or Saint-Domingue, the modern-day Haiti)
 Pierre Lafitte – pirate (born in France or Saint-Domingue, the modern-day Haiti)
 Amiot Métayer – Organized crime leader, once worked for President Jean-Bertrand Aristide to put pressure on the opposing political parties
 Buteur Métayer – Organized crime leader in Haïti during the 2004 Haïti rebellion

Economists and finance
 Leslie Delatour – economist
 Etzer S. Emile - economist
 Fritz Jean – served as governor of the Banque de la République d'Haïti, 1998–2001. From 2012, he has served as President of the Chamber of Commerce, Industry and Professions of the department of Nord-Est.
  Jacques Jiha – economist
 Ericq Pierre – economist
 Jocelerme Privert – President of the Senate Committee on Economy and Finance
Louis Eugène Roy – banker

Entertainment

 Reggie Fils-Aimé – former Chief Operating Officer (COO) of Nintendo of America 
 Arnold Antonin – film director
 Annette Auguste – folk singer
 Stanley Barbot – Haitian-American radio personality
 Garcelle Beauvais – television actress (NYPD Blue, The Jamie Foxx Show)
 Patricia Benoit – director
 Raquel Pelissier - Beauty Queen and Model who was crowned Miss Universe Haiti 2016 and placed first runner up at Miss Universe 2016
 Fabienne Colas – actress, director and producer and head of the Fabienne Colas Foundation
 Joasil Déméus Débrosse – radio journalist
 Jean-Léon Destiné – dancer and choreographer
 Pierre-Louis Dieufaite – actor
 Jeanne Duval – muse, actress and dancer
 Sony Esteus – radio journalist
 Jimmy Jean-Louis – model and actor (film Phat Girlz; television series Heroes)
 Val Jeanty – electronic music artist
 Johny Joseph – news anchor
 Jean-Claude La Marre – writer, director, and film and television actor
 Jeanne-Marie Marsan – French dramatic actress and an opera singer who moved to Saint-Domingue
 Luck Mervil – Canadian actor and singer-songwriter
 Minette et Lise – popular duet-actresses of Saint-Domingue
 Lenelle Moïse – actress, playwright and poet
 Panou – Canadian actor
 Hébert Peck – film producer
 Raoul Peck – film director
 Numa Perrier – actress
 Perri Pierre – award-winning filmmaker and actor
 Emmanuel Pierre-Antoine – professional ballroom dancer
 Michèle Stephenson – filmmaker
 TiCorn – folk singer

Fashion designers 
 Regine Chevallier – fashion designer, best known for her hats
 Fabrice Simon – artist and fashion designer, best known for his handmade beaded dresses

Historical personalities

 Madame Max Adolphe – right-hand woman of François Duvalier during his presidency in Haiti
 Magloire Ambroise – hero of the Haitian Independence
 Anacaona – Taíno cacica (chief) at the time of arrival of Christopher Columbus
 Sanité Bélair – freedom fighter and revolutionary; sergeant in the army of Toussaint Louverture
 Georges Biassou – rebel slave
 Tony Bloncourt – communist who joined the French Resistance against Nazi occupation in World War II
 Rosalvo Bobo – nationalist leader who opposed the U.S. Invasion
 Dutty Boukman – slave who was one of the most visible early leaders of the Haitian Revolution
 Pauline Brice-Thézan – liberal advocator
 Luckner Cambronne – head of the Tonton Macoutes; known as the "Vampire of the Caribbean" for his profiting from the sale of Haitian blood and cadavers to the West for medical uses
 Raymond Cassagnol (fr) – World War II fighter pilot, one of five Haitian members of the Tuskegee Airmen
 Jean-Baptiste Chavannes – Haitian soldier and abolitionist
 Cécile Fatiman – Vodou priestess and a figure of the Haitian Revolution
 Marie-Claire Heureuse Félicité – Empress of Haiti (1804–1806) as the spouse of Jean-Jacques Dessalines
 Catherine Flon – sewed the first Haitian flag
 Guy François – colonel of the armed forces of Haiti, accused of conspiring to overthrow the government in 1989 and 2001
 Jean François – rebel slave
 Michel François – Haitian army colonel who plotted a coup d'etat
 Alice Garoute – Haitian suffragist and women's rights advocate, a founder of Ligue Féminine d'Action Sociale (Feminine League for Social Action)
 Victoire Jean-Baptiste – Haitian politician de facto, mistress to President Florvil Hyppolite
 Jeannot – rebel slave
 Marie-Madeleine Lachenais – first First Lady of Haiti, married to Alexandre Pétion
 Joseph Philippe Lemercier Laroche – engineer and passenger on the ill-fated RMS Titanic
 Adélina Lévêque – Empress Consort of Haiti, 1849–1859, as wife of Faustin I
 Abner Louima – victim of assault and sexual abuse in 1997 by officers of the New York City Police Department
 Macaya – traitor
 François Mackandal – houngan (Vodou priest) and rebel slave leader
 Étienne Mentor – Martinique-born politician who represented Saint-Domingue in the Council of Five Hundred
 Clairvius Narcisse – man said to have been turned into a living zombie by a combination of drugs
 Alix Pasquet – World War II fighter pilot, one of five Haitian members of the Tuskegee Airmen
 Charlemagne Péralte – nationalist leader who opposed the U.S. Invasion
 Gérard Pierre-Charles – politician and former leader of the Unified Party of Haitian Communists
 Jean Baptiste Point du Sable – founder of Chicago, born in Saint-Domingue, the modern-day Haiti
 Marie St. Fleur – first Haitian-American state representative in Massachusetts
 Madeleine Sylvain-Bouchereau – sociologist and educator, a founder of the Ligue Féminine d'Action Sociale (Women's Social Action League)
Modeste Testas – formerly enslaved Ethiopian women, whose life is marked with a statue in Bordeaux
 Charles Terres Weymann – racing pilot and businessman
 Dominique You – privateer, soldier, and politician

Lawyers
 Sarodj Bertin
 Max Hudicourt
 Mario Joseph
 Jacques Nicolas Léger
 Justin Lhérisson
 Vanessa Dalzon
 Alix Mathon
 Alexandre Paul
 Georges Sylvain
 Léon Thébaud
 Yves Volel

Literature

 Jacques Stephen Alexis – doctor, poet, novelist, politician and founder of the Haitian Communist Party and PEP: Parti D'entente Populaire.
 Marlène Rigaud Apollon – poet, youth non-fiction writer
 Beaubrun Ardouin – historian and politician 
 Céligny Ardouin – historian and politician
 Coriolan Ardouin – romantic poet
 Elsie Augustave – author
 Mimi Barthélémy – writer and storyteller
 Jacqueline Beaugé-Rosier – poet, novelist, educator
 Dantès Bellegarde – historian and diplomat
 Bayyinah Bello – historian
 Michèle Bennett – former First Lady, wife of President for Life Jean-Claude Duvalier, later exiled with him
 Boisrond-Tonnerre – the author of the Independence Act of Haiti
 Emeric Bergeaud – novelist
 Guy Joseph Bonnet – historian, army general, signer of the Haitian Act of Independence
 Jean-Fernand Brierre – poet
 Carl Brouard – poet
 Edner Brutus – historian, diplomat and politician
 Timoléon C. Brutus – historian and politician
 Georges Castera – poet
 Suzy Castor – historian and social activist
 Christophe Charles – poet
 Raymond Chassagne – poet and essayist
 Jean-Baptiste Cinéas – novelist and Supreme Court judge
 Massillon Coicou – poet, novelist, playwright, and politician
 Louis-Philippe Dalembert – novelist, poet and essayist, winner of the Cuban Literary Prize Casa de las Américas
 Edwidge Danticat – American author
 Felix Darfour – journalist
 Maggy de Coster – journalist and poet.
 Michel DeGraff – Creolist who has served on the board of the Journal of Haitian Studies
 Demesvar Delorme – theoretician, writer, and politician
 Lilas Desquiron – novelist, ethnologist, cabinet minister
 Roger Dorsinville – poet, dramatist, historian, and diplomat
 Joel Dreyfuss – Haitian-American journalist, editor, and writer now based in Paris, France
 Oswald Durand – poet and politician, said to be "to Haiti what Shakespeare is to England and Dante to Italy."
 Antoine Dupré – poet and playwright
 Frantz Duval – editor-in-chief of Le Nouvelliste newspaper
 Alibée Féry – playwright, poet, and storyteller
 Jessica Fièvre – novelist, editor
 Jean-Claude Fignolé – author
 Anténor Firmin – anthropologist, journalist, and politician
 Frankétienne (born Franck Étienne) – author, poet, playwright, musician and painter. Candidate for Nobel Prize for Literature in 2009
 Fred Edson Lafortune (fr) – poet, writer and editor
 Danielle Legros Georges – award-winning poet, writer, educator, and editor
 Mona Guérin – educator and writer
 Nathalie Handal – award-winning poet, writer, and playwright
 Choiseul Henriquez – journalist
 Fernand Hibbert – novelist, one of the most-widely read Haitian authors
 Ady Jean-Gardy – journalist and activist; founder of the Haitian Press Federation
 Jean-Jacob Jeudy – journalist, activist, politician
 Aubelin Jolicoeur – columnist 
 Johny Joseph – journalist and academic
 Raymond Joseph – journalist, diplomat, political activist
 Laurore St. Juste – historian and author
 Dany Laferrière – Haitian-Canadian novelist and journalist, member of the Académie française
 Edmond Laforest – poet, novelist
 Juliette Bussière Laforest-Courtois – teacher and journalist
 Josaphat-Robert Large – poet, novelist and art critic; won the Prix littéraire des Caraïbes (Caribbean literary Prize) in 2003
 Dimitry Elias Léger – novelist
 François-Romain Lhérisson – poet and educator
 Thomas Madiou – his work Histoire d'Haïti (English: History of Haiti) is considered one of the most valuable documents of Haitian literature
 Marie-Sœurette Mathieu – sociologist, teacher and writer now residing in Quebec.
 Jules Solime Milscent – fabulist, poet, and politician
 Michèle Montas – journalist
 Charles Moravia – poet, dramatist, teacher, and diplomat
 Félix Morisseau-Leroy – author, writer, educator, activist, poet, and playwright
 Émile Nau – historian and politician 
 Marilene Phipps – Haitian-American poet, painter, and short-story writer
 Pradel Pompilus – writer and scholar, best known for his three-volume study of Haitian literature.
 Paulette Poujol-Oriol – educator, writer and feminist
 Emmelie Prophète – writer and diplomat
 Jacques Roumain – poet, novelist, editor
 Émile Roumer – poet
 Edris Saint-Amand – novelist
 Rodney Saint-Éloi – poet
 Prince Saunders – author; emigrated to Haiti from the United States
 Elsie Suréna – poet, photographer
 Marie-Alice Théard – writer
 Évelyne Trouillot – author
 Jocelyne Trouillot – writer
 Alain Turnier – historian
 Gary Victor – writer and playwright
 Etzer Vilaire – poet

Medicine
Yvette Bonny (born 1938) – Haitian Canadian pediatrician
 Henri Ford – Haitian-American pediatric surgeon
 François Fournier de Pescay – first person of color to have practiced medicine and surgery in Europe
 Rulx Léon – physician, historian, and journalist
 Régine Laurent – Haitian-born Canadian nurse and trade unionist
 Bendson Louima – physician and founder of Médecins Sans Frontières  Suisse Cap-Haitïen, an entity for the treatment of cholera in Haiti
 Yvonne Sylvain – first female doctor in Haiti
 Loune Viaud – health care worker, won the 2002 Robert F. Kennedy Human Rights Award for her work within Zanmi Lasante, providing health care in Haiti

Monarchs 

 

 Emperor Jacques I
 King Henri I
 Emperor Faustin I

Music

 Frisner Augustin – major performer and composer of Haitian Vodou drumming
 Othello Bayard – musician, violinist, poet, and composer; wrote the music for the patriotic song "Haïti Chérie"
 Barikad Crew – hip hop group
 BélO – interpreter, composer and guitarist
 Bigga Haitian – first Haitian singer to break into the Jamaican reggae scene
 Toto Bissainthe – folk music artist
 Carmen Brouard – composer and pianist
 Alexandrine-Caroline Branchu – French opera soprano (born in Cap-Français, Saint-Domingue; the modern-day Cap-Haïtien, Haiti)
 Michael Brun – DJ, record producer
 John Steve Brunache – musician
 Frantz Casseus – guitarist and composer
 Manno Charlemagne – political folk singer, songwriter and acoustic guitarist, lifelong political activist and former politician
 Coupé Cloué – singer and bandleader
 Félix Cumbé – Haitian-Dominican singer and songwriter of merengue and bachata music
 Euphémie Daguilh – composer and choreographer, royal mistress of emperor Jean-Jacques Dessalines 
 Jerry Duplessis – Grammy Award-winning musical composer and record producer
 Justin Elie – composer and pianist, one of the best-known composers outside of Haiti
 Yanick Etienne – singer
 Eddy François (singer) – founding member of Boukman Eksperyans and Boukan Ginen
 Gardy Girault – electronic musician, DJ, record producer
 Nicolas Geffrard – musician; composed Haitian national anthem
 Jazz Guignard – distinguished by his completion of one of the first noncommercial recordings of Haitian music
 Lee Holdridge – multi-award-winning Haitian-born composer
 Fred Hype – beatmaker and producer
 Imposs – Canadian rapper
 Werner Jaegerhuber – known for composing "Messe sur les Airs Vodouesques".
 Misty Jean – singer
 Wyclef Jean – Grammy Award-winning singer and former member of The Fugees, hip hop recording artist, musician, actor, and politician
 Nemours Jean-Baptiste – composer and band leader; credited with being the inventor of compas direct
 Val Jeanty – vodou electronica turntablist, percussionist and artist
 Jimmy O – rapper
 Romel Joseph – violinist and music educator.
 Kaytranada – DJ, record producer
 Ludovic Lamothe – composer and virtuoso pianist
 Andrée Lescot – folk singer; daughter of former President Élie Lescot.
 Ti Manno – singer, guitar player, keyboard player, and percussionist
 Master Dji – rapper
 MC Tee – rapper
 Luck Mervil – songwriter-singer
 Emeline Michel – singer
 Mikaben – singer, songwriter, composer and producer
 Michel Mauléart Monton – composer; notable for composing the classic song choucoune (known as yellow bird in the English version)
 Emerante Morse – singer
 Richard Auguste Morse – founder of a mizik rasin band, RAM, named after his initials, and famous in Haiti for their political songs
 Beethova Obas – guitarist
 Carlos Alfredo Peyrellade (1840–1908) – Haitian classical pianist and music educator
 J. Perry – singer and songwriter; song Dekole inspired the theme of the 2012 Carnival and was awarded a Gold Disk Plaque
 Qwote – singer
 Fabrice Rouzier – pianist, producer, and entrepreneur
 Sha Money XL – rapper
 Sweet Micky – singer, politician
 Webert Sicot – saxophone player, composer and band leader, and one of the creators of compas direct. He renamed the music cadence rampa after he left Nemours' band in 1962.
 Ti Ro Ro – drummer; known as 'King of the drum' in Haiti
 André Toussaint – singer and guitarist
 Won-G Bruny – rapper and entrepreneur
 Édouard Woolley – tenor, actor, composer, and music educator

Naturalists and agronomists
 John James Audubon – French-American ornithologist, naturalist, and painter (born in Saint-Domingue, the modern-day Haiti)
 Jean-Baptiste Chavannes – agronomist, awarded the Goldman Environmental Prize in 2005
 Marilise Neptune Rouzier – biologist and ethnobotanist
 Jean Wiener – marine biologist, awarded the Goldman Environmental Prize in 2015

Political figures

 André Apaid – politician and activist leader of Group 184, which helped oust President Jean-Bertrand Aristide
 Jean-Bertrand Aristide – President of Haiti
 Prosper Avril – President of Haiti (1988–1990)
 Jean-Claude Bajeux – political activist and professor of Caribbean literature
 Marc Bazin – United Nations diplomat and World Bank official
 Jean-Pierre Boyer – soldier and President of Haiti
 François Capois – hero of the war of independence
 Ulrick Chérubin – Canadian politician
 Bonivert Claude – former governor of the Banque de la République d'Haïti
 Jean Rénald Clérismé – politician, diplomat, and ambassador
 Marie-Louise Coidavid – Queen of Haiti (1811–1820) as the spouse of Henri I
 Philippe Derose – first Haitian elected to public office in the U.S.
 Emmanuel Dubourg – Canadian politician
 Thomas-Alexandre Dumas – general in Revolutionary France, the highest-ranking person of color in a continental European army
 François Duvalier – former President for Life
 Jean-Claude Duvalier – President of Haiti
 Simone Duvalier – First Lady of the 'Baby Doc' regime
 Mathieu Eugene – U.S. New York City councilman
 Jonathas Granville – soldier, diplomat, civil servant, musician and poet. He promoted the emigration of free Blacks from the U.S. to Haiti.
 Joseph Balthazar Inginac – General of the Pétion-Boyer administration.
 Michaëlle Jean – former Governor General of Canada
 Raymond Joseph – diplomat, political activist, journalist, Haitian ambassador to the United States (2005–2010)
 Gérard Latortue – Prime Minister and official in the United Nations
 Jacques Nicolas Léger – politician, diplomat
 Toussaint Louverture – father of Haiti, leader of Haitian slave rebellion, military general in the Haitian Revolution
 Michel Martelly – musician (a.k.a. Sweet Micky) and President of Haiti
 Alice Téligny Mathon – feminine activist
 Jovenel Moïse – President (2017–2021)
 Vincent Ogé – revolutionary
 Gerald Oriol Jr. – Secretary of State for the Integration of Persons with Disabilities
 Ertha Pascal-Trouillot – provisional President of Haiti 1990–1991, the first woman to hold that office
 José Francisco Peña Gómez – Dominican politician and activist
 Charlemagne Péralte – nationalist leader and revolutionary
 Alexandre Pétion – nationalist, revolutionary and first President of Haiti
 Solange Pierre – human rights advocate in the Dominican Republic who worked to end antihaitianismo
 Michèle Pierre-Louis – second female Prime Minister of Haiti (2008–2009)
 René Préval – President (2006–2011)
 Julien Raimond – agriculturalist and revolutionary
 André Rigaud – military leader during the Haitian Revolution
 François C. Antoine Simon – President (1908–1911)
 Sténio Vincent – President of Haiti (1930–1941)
 Claudette Werleigh – first Haitian woman to become Prime Minister

Religion

 Antoine Adrien – Roman Catholic priest and liberation theology advocate
 Eliezer Cadet – Vodou priest involved in the UNIA in the United States
 Emmanuel Constant – Roman Catholic bishop
 François Gayot – Roman Catholic archbishop
 Gérard Jean-Juste – Roman Catholic priest and rector of Saint Claire's church for the poor in Port-au-Prince
 Mary Elizabeth Lange – founder of a Roman Catholic religious community for women
 Chibly Langlois – Haiti's first Roman Catholic cardinal
 Mama Lola – Vodou priestess
Olin Pierre Louis – Roman Catholic priest in San Juan, Puerto Rico
 Joseph Serge Miot – Roman Catholic archbishop
 Pierre-Antoine Paulo – Roman Catholic bishop
 Guy Sansaricq – first Haitian-born Roman Catholic bishop in the United States
 Pierre Toussaint – philanthropist and candidate for sainthood in the Roman Catholic Church
 Juliette Toussaint – wife of Pierre Toussaint; philanthropist

Science
 Max Beauvoir – chemist
 Hermanie Pierre – Haitian-American civil engineer and Miss Haiti International winner

Sports

American football players

 Jocelyn Borgella – former defensive back
 Gosder Cherilus – offensive tackle
 Gilles Colon – wide receiver
 Pierre Desir – cornerback
 Vladimir Ducasse – offensive lineman
 Farell Duclair – fullback in the Canadian Football League
 Jean Fanor – safety
 Junior Galette – linebacker
 Max Jean-Gilles – guard
 Ricot Joseph – safety
 Nico Marley – linebacker
 Dadi Nicolas – outside linebacker
 Kevin Pamphile – left tackle
 Paul Raymond – wide receiver
 Jonal Saint-Dic – defensive end

Basketball

 Djery Baptiste – college basketball player
 Kervin Bristol – professional basketball player currently playing for the KK Włocławek of the Polish Basketball League.
 Samuel Dalembert – former professional basketball player in the National Basketball Association
 Schnider Hérard – college basketball player
 Osvaldo Jeanty – professional basketball player
 Rudolphe Joly – professional basketball player
 Antoine Joseph – professional basketball player in the American Basketball League
 Robert Joseph – former professional basketball player who played in the Liga ACB in Spain for twelve seasons.
 Yvon Joseph – professional basketball player, the first Haitian to play NCAA college basketball in the United States
 Skal Labissière – professional basketball player for the Sacramento Kings in the National Basketball Association
 Cady Lalanne – professional basketball player
 Gino Lanisse – Haitian-Swiss professional basketball player, who played in the Swiss pro league
 Marc-Eddy Norelia – college basketball player
 Olden Polynice – professional basketball player
 Pierre Valmera – retired professional basketball player, who played in the Swiss pro league

Boxing

 Joachim Alcine – professional boxer
 Azea Augustama – professional boxer; who qualified for the 2008 Olympic Games at light-heavy through a bronze medal finish at the second Americas qualifier; he also won the Golden Gloves in 2008
 Andre Berto – professional boxer
 Edner Cherry – Haitian-Bahamian professional boxer
 Richardson Hitchins – Olympic boxer
 Schiller Hyppolite – professional boxer
 Dierry Jean – professional boxer
 Jean Pascal – professional boxer
 Melissa St. Vil – women's lightweight American boxer
 Adonis Stevenson – professional boxer, current WBC light heavyweight champion
 Bermane Stiverne – professional boxer, current WBC heavyweight champion, also the first boxer of Haitian descent to win a heavyweight title

Football

 Ricardo Adé – professional football player
 Jean Sony Alcénat – professional football player
 Jean Alexandre – professional football player
 Djimy Alexis – professional football player
 Fritz André – professional football player
 Wedson Anselme – professional football player
 Eddy Antoine – professional football player who participated for Haiti at the 1974 FIFA World Cup
 Carlens Arcus – professional football player
 Ernst Atis-Clotaire – former professional football player; spent most of his career for AS Monaco FC
 Wilberne Augusmat – professional football player
 Arsène Auguste – former professional football player
 Walson Augustin – professional football player
 Jean-Herbert Austin – professional football player
 Judelin Aveska – professional football player
 Bidrece Azor – professional football player
 Claude Barthélemy – professional football player
 Pierre Bayonne – professional football player
 Kervens Belfort – professional football player
 Bicou Bissainthe – professional football player
 Kensie Bobo – women's professional football player
 Alexandre Boucicaut – professional football player
 John Boulos – professional football player
 Kimberly Boulos – professional women's football player
 Samantha Brand – professional women's football player
 Pierre Richard Bruny – professional football player
 Éliphène Cadet – professional football player
 Davidson Charles – professional football player
 Phenol Charles – professional football player
 Ricardo Charles – professional football player
 Monès Chéry – professional football player
 Alex Junior Christian – professional football player
 Coupé Cloué – professional football player
 Monuma Constant Jr. – professional football player
 Ronaldo Damus – professional football player
 Johnny Descolines – professional football player
 Jean-Claude Désir – professional football player
 Jonel Désiré – professional football player
 Wisline Dolce – professional women's football player
 Rudy Doliscat – Canadian professional football player
 Serge Ducosté – professional football player
 Ronil Dufrene – American professional football player
 Wagneau Eloi – professional football player
 Ronald Elusma – professional football player
 Lesly Fellinga – professional football player
 Gabard Fénélon – professional football player
 Pat Fidelia – professional football player
 Herby Fortunat – professional football player
 Henri Françillon – professional football player
 Christiano François – professional football player
 Guy François – professional football player
 Jacques Francois – professional football player
 Jean-Baptiste Fritzson – professional football player
 Brunel Fucien – professional football player
 Joe Gaetjens – professional football player who scored the only goal in the United States's upset of England at the 1950 FIFA World Cup
 Romain Genevois – professional football player
 Peter Germain – professional football player
 Yvrase Gervil – professional women's football player
 Frantz Gilles – professional football player
 Réginal Goreux – Belgian professional football player
 Marc Hérold Gracien – professional football player
 Wilde-Donald Guerrier – professional football player
 Stéphane Guillaume – professional football player
 Herve Guilliod – professional football player
 Alain Gustave – professional football player
 Charles Hérold Jr. – professional football player
 Jean-François James – professional football player
 Patrick Janvier – professional football player
 Bitielo Jean Jacques – professional football player
 Jamil Jean-Jacques – professional football player
 Ernst Jean-Joseph – professional football player
 Jean-Dimmy Jéoboam – professional football player
 Jean-Robens Jerome – professional football player
 Mechack Jérôme – professional football player
 Gérard Joseph – professional football player
 Peterson Joseph – professional football player
 Jacques LaDouceur – professional football player
 Rosario Lauture – professional football player
 Fritz Leandré – professional football player
 Roody Lormera – professional football player
 Jeff Louis – professional football player
 Manoucheka Pierre Louis – professional women's football player
 Wilfried Louis – professional football player
 James Marcelin – professional football player
 Kencia Marseille – professional women's football player
 Frantz Mathieu – professional football player
 Jean-Robert Menelas – professional football player
 Pierre Mercier – professional football player
 Rénald Metelus – professional football player
 Pascal Millien – professional football player, currently playing for Sheikh Russel KC in the Bangladesh Premier League
 Frandy Montrévil – professional football player
 Wilner Nazaire – professional football player who participated for Haiti at the 1974 FIFA World Cup
 Duckens Nazon – professional football player
 Fabrice Noël – professional football player
 Windsor Noncent – professional football player
 Regillio Nooitmeer – Dutch professional football player
 Sony Norde – professional football player
 Vladimir Pascal – professional football player
 Peguero Jean Philippe – professional football player
 Bony Pierre – professional football player
 Golman Pierre – former professional football player
 Jean-Jacques Pierre – professional football player who currently plays for the French club SM Caen
 Marie Yves Dina Jean Pierre – professional women's football player
 Ricardo Pierre-Louis – professional football player
 Frantzdy Pierrot – professional football player
 Wilner Piquant – professional football player
 Serge Racine – professional football player
 Darline Radamaker – professional women's football player
 Guerry Romondt – professional football player
 Steeven Saba – professional women's football player
 Widner Saint-Cyr – professional football player
 Steeve Saint-Duc – professional football player
 Leonel Saint-Preux – professional football player
 Guy Saint-Vil – professional football player
 Roger Saint-Vil – professional football player
 Emmanuel Sanon – professional football player
 Emmanuel Sarki – professional football player
 Vaniel Sirin – professional football player
 Richelor Sprangers – professional football player
 Frantz St. Lot – professional football player
 Antoine Tassy – former professional football player and manager of the Haitian national football team in the 1974 FIFA World Cup
 Abel Thermeus – professional football player
 Denso Ulysse – professional football player
 Kénold Versailles – professional football player
 Fabien Vorbe – professional football player
 Philippe Vorbe – professional football player
 Sébastien Vorbe – professional football player
 Lindsay Zullo – professional women's football player

Other sports

 Ronald Agénor – professional tennis player
 Ludovic Augustin –  Olympic sport shooter, part of the team that won Haiti's first Olympic medal, at the 1924 Summer Olympics
 Ange Jean Baptiste – judoka who has participated internationally. She won a silver medal at the 2006 Central American and Caribbean Games.
 Maxime Boisclair – professional Canadian hockey player
 Joel Brutus –  judoka, won a silver medal at the 2003 Pan American Games
 Dayana Cadeau – Haitian-born Canadian-American professional bodybuilder
 Josué Cajuste – Paralympic athlete
 Asnage Castelly – Olympic wrestler; founder of the Haitian Wrestling Federation
 Silvio Cator – Former world record holder in long jump and Olympic silver medal winner at 1928 Summer Olympics
 L. H. Clermont – Olympic sport shooter who was part of the team that won Haiti's first ever Olympic medal, a bronze in team free rifle at the 1924 Summer Olympics
 Gerald Clervil – Olympic track and field athlete 
 André Corvington – Olympic fencer; competed in the individual foil event at the 1900 Summer Olympics
 Dadi Denis – Olympic sprinter
 Linouse Desravine – judoka
 Destin Destine – Olympic sport shooter; part of the team that won the first Olympic medal for Haiti
 C. Dupre – Olympic sport shooter
 Victoria Duval – professional tennis player
 Ginou Etienne – Olympic track and field athlete
 Neyssa Etienne – professional tennis player
 Gina Faustin – Olympic fencer; competed in the individual foil event at the 1984 Summer Olympics
 Nadine Faustin-Parker – Olympic hurdler and medal winner at the 2002 Central American and Caribbean Games
 Edrick Floréal – Olympic long and triple jumper who competed for Canada
 Naomy Grand'Pierre – Olympic swimmer
 Constantin Henriquez – Olympic Rugby player and footballer; co-founder of Haitian football
 Yves Jabouin – mixed martial arts fighter
 Nephtalie Jean-Louis – Paralympic athlete
 Jeffrey Julmis – Olympic sprinter
 Dieudonné LaMothe – long-distance runner, the first sportsperson from Haiti to take part in four Olympic Games
 Ernst Laraque –  judoka from Haiti, won a bronze medal at the 2003 Pan American Games
 Parnel Legros – former Olympic judoka 
 Aniya Louissaint – Olympic Taekwondo athlete.
 Bertrand Madsen – former professional tennis player
 Eloi Metullus – Olympic sport shooter; part of the team that won the first Olympic medal for Haiti
 Jean-Louis Michel – a fencing master (born in Saint-Domingue)
 Charles Olemus – Olympic track and field athlete
 Barbara Pierre – track and field sprint athlete in the Pan American Games
 Astrel Rolland – Olympic sport shooter
 Claude Roumain – Olympic sprinter
 Deborah Saint-Phard – Olympic shot putter at the 1988 Summer Olympics
 Tudor Sanon – taekwondo athlete
 Alain Sergile – swimmer who competed at the 1996 Summer Olympics
 Bruny Surin – 1996 Canadian Olympian, gold-medal-winning sprinter
 André Théard – Olympic sprinter; competed for Haiti at the 1924, 1928 and 1932 Summer Olympics
 Léon Thiércelin – Olympic fencer; competed in the individual foil event at the 1900 Summer Olympics
 Ludovic Valborge – Olympic sport shooter, part of the team that won Haiti's first Olympic medal, at the 1924 Summer Olympics
 Sheila Viard – Olympic fencer; competed in the individual foil event at the 1984 Summer Olympics
 Claude Vilgrain – Canadian professional hockey player

See also
 People of Haitian descent
 Haitian Canadians
 Haitian diaspora
 Haitians in France
 List of Haitian Americans

References

External links
  Learn About Haitian Celebrities around the world